The 2002 J&S Cup was a tennis tournament played on clay courts in Warsaw, Poland. The event was part of the 2002 WTA Tour. The tournament was held from May 6 to 12, 2002.

Finals

Singles

 Elena Bovina defeated  Henrieta Nagyová, 6–3, 6–1.

Doubles

 Jelena Kostanić /  Henrieta Nagyová defeated  Evgenia Kulikovskaya /  Silvija Talaja, 6–1, 6–1.

References

External links
WTA Profile

JandS Cup
Warsaw Open
War